Parvunaria is a genus of dwarf spiders containing the single species, Parvunaria birma. It was  first described by A. V. Tanasevitch in 2018, and is only found in Myanmar.

References

External links

Linyphiidae
Monotypic Araneomorphae genera